Robert Shenton French  (born 19 March 1947) is an Australian lawyer and judge who served as the twelfth Chief Justice of Australia, in office from 2008 to 2017. He has been the chancellor of the University of Western Australia since 2017.

French was born in Perth, Western Australia, and is a graduate of the University of Western Australia. He was admitted as a barrister and solicitor in 1972, and appointed to the Federal Court in 1986, serving as a justice on that court until his elevation to the High Court. He also held a number of other positions during that time, notably serving as chancellor of Edith Cowan University (1991–1997), chairman of the National Native Title Tribunal (1994–1998), and on the Supreme Court of Fiji (2003–2008). In July 2008, Prime Minister Kevin Rudd named French to succeed Murray Gleeson as chief justice, taking office just over a month later. He became the first chief justice from Western Australia, and the third justice overall (after Sir Ronald Wilson and John Toohey).

Early life and education
French was educated at St. Louis School (now John XXIII College) in Perth. Notably, he was one of two students from Western Australia to attend the International Science School, then known as the Nuclear Research Foundation Summer Science School, in 1964 at the University of Sydney.

French attended the University of Western Australia in Perth, where he graduated with a Bachelor of Science in Physics in 1968. He then continued with further study at the University of Western Australia, earning a Bachelor of Laws in 1971. He said in 2009 "I enrolled in the study of law at the University of Western Australia in 1968 with no particular idea of being a lawyer. I had graduated in physics the previous year and had decided that I was not going to be a great theoretical physicist. This decision
was assisted by the Dean of Science who, after I gave a seminar presentation in my third year, complemented me on the magnificence of my presentation but expressed a doubt that I knew what I was talking about." He was President of the university's Liberal Club and served briefly as treasurer of the University of Western Australia Student Guild.

Career
In 1969, at the age of 22, French contested the safe Labor Federal seat of Fremantle for the Liberal Party, which he lost to Kim Beazley, Sr. He later said: "Fortunately I lost. I do not think I would have made a very good politician... It was an enjoyable learning experience. It involved the kind of valuable interaction with people whom I would never normally have encountered. That has served me well in later life." "I was assisted by a rock band called "The Time Piece". I took the band to Rottnest Island and set up on the back of a truck outside the Quokka Arms Hotel. We handed out pamphlets with the heading "Pop Politics in the Swinging Seat". The band played music and between songs I made short political speeches. A large crowd gathered and listened to the music, but whenever I started to speak would move forward and begin rocking the truck. The drummer became upset and said that they didn't appreciate good music. I assured him that the demonstration of popular discontent with my political speeches had nothing to do with his music." He is a close friend of Kim Beazley, Jr. French served as President of the Fremantle Branch of the Liberal Party and hence on the State Executive of the Party.

In 1972, French was admitted as a barrister and solicitor in Western Australia. He worked on important cases, such as the High Court case, Yager v The Queen, which focused on complex matters of law and botanical science.

The Hawke government appointed French to the Federal Court in 1986, at the age of 39.

During the Tampa Affair, French was part of the Full Court of the Federal Court that reversed the order of habeas corpus that had been earlier granted by a single judge.

On 30 July 2008, Prime Minister Kevin Rudd announced that French would succeed Murray Gleeson as Chief Justice of the High Court of Australia. He was sworn in on 1 September 2008. He is the first Chief Justice of the High Court not to have taken silk at appointment.

French has served on numerous bodies including as part-time Commissioner of the Australian Law Reform Commission (2006–2008), Additional Judge of the Supreme Court of the ACT (2004–2008), Judge of the Supreme Court of Fiji (2003–2008), President of the National Native Title Tribunal (1994–1998), Council Member of the Australian Institute of Judicial Administration (1992–1998), Chancellor of Edith Cowan University (1991–1997), Member of the Law Reform Commission of Western Australia (1986), Chairman of the Town Planning Appeals Tribunal of Western Australia (1986), Associate Member of the Australian Trade Practices Commission (1983–1986), member of the Legal Aid Commission of Western Australia (1983–1986), Member of the Barrister's Board of Western Australia (1979–1986), and Chairman of the Aboriginal Legal Service of Western Australia (1973–1975).

On 18 January 2017, French was appointed a non-permanent judge of the Court of Final Appeal of the Hong Kong Special Administrative Region. He is given a Chinese name "范禮全" by the Hong Kong Judiciary.

French retired as Chief Justice on 29 January 2017. He was succeeded by Susan Kiefel.

On 20 June 2017, the University of Western Australia announced French's appointment as UWA's fifteenth chancellor. He succeeded Dr Michael Chaney AO as chancellor in November 2017.

Beliefs and positions

On politics
Although once the President of the Liberal Club of the University of Western Australia, French's views are described as being closer to socially progressive, small–l liberal, and moderate.

On republicanism
French said in a WA Law Society speech in May 2008:
"It is unacceptable in contemporary Australia that the legal head of the Australian state... can never be chosen by the people or their representatives, cannot be other than a member of the Anglican Church, can never be other than British and can never be an indigenous person."

On indigenous issues
Justice French is known for working for the rights of Indigenous Australians: in the early 1970s, he helped found the WA Aboriginal Legal Service. He was also the first president of the National Native Title Tribunal.

At his swearing-in ceremony as Chief Justice, French specifically referred to the long history of indigenous Australia:
Recognition of their presence is no mere platitude. The history of Australia's indigenous people dwarfs, in its temporal sweep, the history that gave rise to the Constitution under which this court was created. Our awareness and recognition of that history is becoming, if it has not already become, part of our national identity.

However, the 'French Testing' incident has coloured the legacy of French on indigenous issues. French admitted his 'error' when he explained the incident:
As I soon discovered, the responsibilities of an administrator trying to develop procedures to implement a legal process are very different from those of a judge required to decide a particular case about whether an administrator's decision is legally flawed. The Tribunal was judicially reviewed on many occasions. The high point or low point, depending on your point of view, occurred after I had refused registration of a claim by the Waanyi people over land the subject of the proposed Century Zinc mine in North Queensland. I refused registration on the basis that the application could not succeed because of the extinguishing effects of historical pastoral leases in the area. I took the view that observations about the extinguishing effects of leases made by Brennan J in Mabo put the matter beyond doubt. My refusal to register the claim was an administrative act in the application of a test designed to screen out hopeless claims. The decision was overturned by the High Court in North Ganalanja[2] with such moral enthusiasm that the Court gave judgment immediately and reasons later. In so doing, it described my approach as "tantamount to a proleptic exercise of federal jurisdiction". To add insult to injury, members of the Waanyi people were sitting in Court wearing T-shirts with the message "Ban French Testing". I have no doubt, in retrospect, that I was properly found to have been in error. The considerations influencing my approach were those of the administrator, the urgent need to get the process moving and to establish its credibility in the face of ongoing attacks. There was a legal bottleneck on the issue of the relationship between pastoral leases and native title which was not resolved until the decision in Wik. Many ill-prepared applications were being lodged and upon registration were entitled to procedural rights affecting third party interests particularly in relation to mining and the release of Crown land for development around regional centres. I learned a useful lesson from all of this and that is that the worldview and culture of the administrator which I had adopted is very different from that of the courts.

Awards
 Honorary Doctor of Laws, Edith Cowan University, 1998
 Western Australian Citizen of the Year – Professions, 1998
 Centenary Medal, 2001, for service as President of the National Native Title Tribunal and as a Federal Court judge
 Companion of the Order of Australia, 2010, for eminent service to the law and to the judiciary, to legal education and administration in the areas of constitutional, competition and native title law, and to legal reform.
 Life Fellow, Australian Academy of Law

Personal life
French is a fan of the Fremantle Dockers AFL team. He is married to Valerie J. French, who completed her LL.B. at the University of Western Australia in 1971 and has served as the President of the Children's Court of Western Australia.

References

1947 births
Living people
People from Perth, Western Australia
Judges of the Federal Court of Australia
Chief justices of Australia
Justices of the High Court of Australia
Companions of the Order of Australia
Supreme Court of Fiji justices
Australian judges on the courts of Fiji
Australian judges on the courts of Hong Kong
Justices of the Court of Final Appeal (Hong Kong)
Academic staff of Edith Cowan University
University of Western Australia chancellors
Judges of the Supreme Court of the Australian Capital Territory
Fellows of the Australian Academy of Law
20th-century Australian judges
21st-century Australian judges
Judges of the Supreme Court of Christmas Island
Judges of the Supreme Court of the Cocos (Keeling) Islands
Hong Kong judges